Mount Hochlin is a large ice-topped mountain,  high, standing east of Festninga Mountain in the Mühlig-Hofmann Mountains of Queen Maud Land, Antarctica. The Spøta Spur extends from its north-central section.
It was mapped by Norwegian cartographers from surveys and air photos by the Sixth Norwegian Antarctic Expedition (1956–60) and named for L. Hochlin, a radio operator and dog driver with the expedition (1956–58).

See also
Stålstuten Ridge
Tunet Valley

References

Mountains of Queen Maud Land
Princess Martha Coast